Hemisinus brevis is a species of freshwater snail with an operculum, an aquatic gastropod mollusk in the family Thiaridae.

Distribution 
Hemisinus brevis is endemic to the Pinar del Río with scarce distribution in Cuba.

References

External links 

Thiaridae
Gastropods described in 1841
Endemic fauna of Cuba